Little Oblivions is the third studio album by American singer-songwriter Julien Baker, released on February 26, 2021. Alongside the album's announcement, Baker released "Faith Healer" as the first single from the album. Little Oblivions is a departure from the acoustic alt folk of her first two albums. It features a full band sound, played almost entirely by Baker herself, with genres encompassing indie rock, alternative rock, emo, soft rock, electronic music, pop punk, post-rock, country, shoegaze, and slowcore. The album received acclaim from critics.

Background
On April 8, 2020, Baker performed the song "Mercy," titled "Song in E" on the album, in a livestream on Instagram Live. This was the first widely publicized performance of "Song in E," which Baker had played at shows in August 2018 and again in mid-2019, along with an early version of "Ringside," another track that would appear on Little Oblivions.

The first single off of Little Oblivions, "Faith Healer," was released on October 21, 2020.

Critical reception

Little Oblivions was met with widespread critical acclaim. At Metacritic, which assigns a normalized rating out of 100 to reviews from professional publications, the release received an average score of 84, based on 22 reviews, indicating "universal acclaim". Aggregator AnyDecentMusic? gave the album an 8.0 out of 10, based on their assessment of the critical consensus.

Adam Feibel of Exclaim! said "After two critically lauded albums of raw, powerful alt-folk — as well as a rapturously received collaboration with Phoebe Bridgers and Lucy Dacus as boygenius — Memphis-based singer-songwriter Julien Baker has burst forth with a third effort that's so fully formed and viscerally human, it might as well have its own pulse." Tatiana Tenreyro of The A.V. Club said "In many ways, Little Oblivions is a re-introduction to Baker’s music. Both of her previous records focused on a soft, minimalist sound that highlighted Baker’s powerful voice and words. It’s the kind of music that is best listened to alone." DIY writer Ben Tipple said that the album sees Baker "accompanied by an expanse of instrumentation previously absent from her sound, and drums drive Little Oblivions forward with a disarming urgency. At times, the hushed subtlety of the two previous records is all-but forgotten, not least as ‘Ringside’ leans on heavy reverb and ‘Repeat’ turns to electronic pulses and distorted vocals. It’s new territory for Julien, but one she traverses with ease, complementing her more overt tales of faith, inebriation and inter-personal relationships" Despite this, as Marcy Donelson of AllMusic puts it, "Despite the bigger sound on average, however, Baker's brutal lyrical authenticity remains the main attraction." Callum Foulds of The Line of Best Fit highly praised the album, saying "Rarely does an artist so eagerly present themselves in relentlessly un-pretty circumstances, that it makes listening equally as uncomfortable and as it is captivating. Julien Baker has delivered music so full of emotional clarity that it seems a miracle that she survived its creation." John Amen of Slant gave the album 4 out of 5 stars, writing: "Little Oblivions represents a significant step for one of contemporary music’s most eloquent artists."

Accolades

Track listing

Personnel 
Sources

Musicians
 Julien Baker – vocals, guitars, bass, keyboards, drums, percussion
 Phoebe Bridgers – backing vocals (track 8)
 Lucy Dacus – backing vocals (track 8)
 Calvin Lauber - additional instrumentation 
Production
 Julien Baker – producer
 Calvin Lauber – engineer
 Craig Silvey – mixing
 Greg Calbi – mastering

Charts

References

2021 albums
Julien Baker albums
Matador Records albums